The South African Rugby League is the governing body for the sport of rugby league football in South Africa. The Association was formed in 1998.

See also

 Rugby league in South Africa
 South Africa national rugby league team

References

External links

Rugby league governing bodies
Rugby league in South Africa
Rugby
Sports organizations established in 1998